Raúl Dávila (September 15, 1931 – January 2, 2006) was an actor, who is best remembered in the United States for his role of Hector Santos in the American soap opera All My Children. In his home country of Puerto Rico, he is perhaps better remembered as the titular "Carmelo" of the hit WAPA-TV sitcom, "Carmelo y Punto".

Early years

Dávila was born in San Juan, Puerto Rico where he received his primary and secondary education.  After graduating from high school, he enrolled in the University of Puerto Rico where he studied dramatic arts. He continued his education at Tulane University in New Orleans, Louisiana and then earned his master's degree in Dramatic Arts from the Pasadena Playhouse in California.

Acting debut
In 1957, Dávila began his acting career in Puerto Rico's Telemundo television station.  He worked in over 20 locally produced soap operas alongside the likes of Braulio Castillo and Mario Pabon.  After six years with Telemundo, Dávila decided to try his luck in the United States and moved to New York City.

Acting in the United States
He arrived in the city on November 23, 1963, the day after President John F. Kennedy was assassinated.  At first it was difficult for Dávila to find work as an actor, since in the 1960s there wasn't much of a demand for Hispanic actors.  With the help of fellow Puerto Ricans Raúl Juliá and Míriam Colón, he was able to find work in a Spanish Language television station program called "Tribuna Hispana" (Hispanic Tribune) which was followed by "Mundo Latino" (Latino World), "De tú a tú con Raúl", "Realidades" (Reality) and "The Puerto Rican New Yorker".

Dávila presided over the Hispanic Organization of Latin Actors, also known as HOLA, an organization to which actor Raúl Juliá lent his support.  The organizations goal is to celebrate Latino achievements in the field of entertainment.  Dávila began making appearances on some of the popular T.V. shows of the day, such as The Patty Duke Show, The Defenders and East Side.  He also landed small roles in the movies The Man with My Face, Counterplot and Felicia.  Besides those small roles he supported himself by making commercials for Campbell's Soup, Colgate and The New York Telephone Co.

As early as 1964, his acting talents were showcased on the CBS Television network in collaboration with the conductor Alfredo Antonini, in an episode of the CBS Repertoire Workshop- "Feliz Borinquen" playing himself.

In 1974, he played the lead role in Luis Rafael Sánchez' presentation of "O casi el alma", both in Spanish and English.

In 1985, Dávila returned to the island to film La Gran Fiesta, a film produced and directed by Marcos Zurinaga.  In 1987, he made his official movie debut in the United States, in the film The Believers alongside actor Martin Sheen.  In the states, Dávila also participated in the following soap operas: The Guiding Light, The Doctors "One Life to Live" and All My Children, where he played the role of Hector Santos for four years.

Later years
Dávila lived in New Jersey, but he traveled constantly between New Jersey and Puerto Rico.  In Puerto Rico, he played the lead role in the television comedy Carmelo y Punto.  He also acted in three locally produced films, Linda Sara (with Chayanne and Dayanara Torres), Milagro en Yauco and Los Diaz de Doris.

Raúl Dávila died on January 2, 2006,  at his home in Newark, New Jersey from a heart attack. On January 6, 2006, New York Democratic Congressman José Serrano released a statement to be submitted to the Congressional Record honoring Dávila.

Theater 
Dávila spent most of the decade of the 70's doing theater.  Among the many productions in which he worked were:

 Bodas de Sangra - Leonardo
 Yerma - Juan
 Tonight or Never - Franz
 South Pacific - The Professor
 Kiss me Kate - Hortensio
 La vida es un sueño - Segismundo
 The King and I - The King
 The Sun looks Down - Anselmo
 The Sound of Music - Captain Von Trapp
 La Viliza - Osvaldo
 Quién le teme a Virginia Wolf?

Filmography 
1959: Counterplot - Messenger
1965: The Patty Duke Show (TV Series) - Carlos
1965: Heroína - Judge
1966: El Escuadrón del pánico
1984: A Doctor's Story (TV Movie) - Jack Angel
1985: Private Sessions (TV Movie) - Mr. Fontana
1985: La Gran Fiesta - Don Miguel de la Torre
1986: Florida Straits (TV Movie) - Esteban
1987: The Believers - Oscar Sezine 
1988: The Trial of Bernhard Goetz (TV Series) - Flores
1990: The Old Man and the Sea (TV Movie)
1991: Fires Within - Reuben
1991: Camelo y Punto (TV Movie) - Camelo
1992: Le Grand pardon II - Emilio Esteban
1993: La guagua aérea - Ernesto 
1994: Law & Order (Episode: "Coma") - Camacho
1994: New York Undercover (Episode: "Missing" November 3) - Martinez
1994: Linda Sara - Doctor Baez
1994-1998: All My Children (TV Series) - Hector Santos
1999: Los Diaz de Doris - Rodolfo
2005: Fuego en el alma - (final film role)

See also

List of Puerto Ricans

References

External links 

Murió el actor Raúl Dávila
Biography on Fondación Nacional

1931 births
2006 deaths
Puerto Rican male film actors
Puerto Rican male soap opera actors
Puerto Rican male television actors
Male actors from San Juan, Puerto Rico
Tulane University alumni
20th-century American male actors